"Baltimore" is the debut single released by a pre-fame Tori Amos, under her birth name of (Myra) Ellen Amos.

Amos, then 16 years old, wrote the song with her brother Michael in response to a 1979 contest by the city of Baltimore, Maryland. Her new theme song for the Baltimore Orioles baseball team won the contest.

Pressed on only 500 7-inch vinyl records, it was given a citation by the Mayor of Baltimore. As of 2022, a copy of this record complete with original sleeve sells for $2,000 US. The sleeve is not a picture sleeve. A copy with an original resume for "Ellen Amos" could go for as much as $7,000 . It features a B-side track,  "Walking With You". It was released on "MEA Records", which was Amos' initials.

Max Welker played guitar on both songs (Yamaha SA-2000).

Track listing
 "Baltimore" – 3:31
 "Walking With You" – 4:28

References

Tori Amos songs
Songs written by Tori Amos
Culture of Baltimore
1980 debut singles
1980 songs